Hugh Anthony Atkinson (born 8 November 1960) is an Irish former professional footballer who played as a defender.

Career
Atkinson moved from his native Ireland to join the youth ranks at Wolverhampton Wanderers in 1978. He later made his senior debut on 12 January 1980 in a 3–0 win over Bristol City.

The 1980–81 season was his most successful at Molineux, as he made 27 appearances. After the club were relegated from the First Division at the end of the following season amid financial turmoil, he left to join Exeter City, after 51 appearances and 3 goals for the club in total.

He experienced another relegation at Exeter as the club dropped into the fourth tier in 1984, upon which he moved on to York City, from where he had a loan spell at Darlington.

References
 

1960 births
Living people
Association footballers from Dublin (city)
Republic of Ireland association footballers
Republic of Ireland under-21 international footballers
Wolverhampton Wanderers F.C. players
Exeter City F.C. players
York City F.C. players
Darlington F.C. players
English Football League players
Harrisons F.C. players
Belvedere F.C. players
Association football defenders